Chevillard may refer to:

Chevillard (meat), a French method of dealing with fat on meat in an abattoir.
 Chevillard, Ain, a commune in the Ain department of France
Jean Chevillard (1618-1683)
Maurice Chevillard, French aviator
Éric Chevillard (born 1964)
Camille Chevillard (1859–1923), French composer